
Gmina Szaflary is a rural gmina (administrative district) in Nowy Targ County, Lesser Poland Voivodeship, in southern Poland.

Villages
The gmina contains the villages of Bańska Niżna, Bańska Wyżna, Bór, Maruszyna, Skrzypne, Szaflary and Zaskale.

Neighbouring gminas
Gmina Szaflary is bordered by the town of Nowy Targ and by the gminas of Biały Dunajec, Bukowina Tatrzańska, Czarny Dunajec and Nowy Targ.

References
Polish official population figures 2006

Szaflary
Nowy Targ County